Yul Wonci Lui is an American actress and dancer of Chinese ancestry. She performed in Kismet, as an Arabian dancer in the number "Not Since Ninevah." She performed in the Rodgers and Hammerstein production Flower Drum Song from 1958 to 1960, as well as various productions of The King and I. As of 2022, she lives in Hawaii near her daughter as Wonci Yee.

References

External links 

 

American film actresses
American stage actresses
American actresses of Chinese descent
Living people
1930 births
21st-century American women